Reo Addai Basoah (1936 – July 30, 2002) was a Member of Parliament for the Kumawu Constituency of the Ashanti Region of Ghana. He was a member of the second and third parliament of the 4th republic of Ghana. He was also the chairman of the Finance Committee of the Parliament of Ghana in 1997 until he became the member of parliament after winning in the 1996 general elections.

Basoah died at the Korle-Bu Teaching Hospital on 30 July 2002 after a short illness.

Early life and education 
Basoah was born in 1936 and studied at Cambridge Technical College in London. He also studied at Yale University before proceeding to King's College in Cambridge to pursue a course in Economics. In 1962 he became Barrister-at-Law in Lincoln's Inn. Basoah also worked as an economist at the Commonwealth Economic Committee in London and at the World Bank in Washington, D.C. from 1965 to 1972.

Politics 
His political career began in 1992 when he first entered Parliament as a commissioner for the state enterprise commission. He was later appointed as the chairman of the finance committee in 1997. He contested in the 1996 general elections as a representative of the Kumawu constituency on the ticket of the New Patriotic Party and won with a total of 15,025 of the total votes cast that year. He then contested again in the 2000 general elections and retained his seat for the second time with a total of 13,554 votes making 57.80% of the total votes cast. He died before the end of his parliamentary term.

Death 
Basoah died at the Korle-Bu Teaching Hospital after being admitted for three days following a short illness.

References 

1936 births
2002 deaths
Ghanaian economists
New Patriotic Party politicians
Government ministers of Ghana
Ghanaian MPs 1997–2001
Ghanaian MPs 2001–2005
People from Ashanti Region
Alumni of the University of Cambridge
Alumni of King's College London
20th-century Ghanaian lawyers